Habroteleia soa is a species of wasp belonging to the family Platygastridae. It is the most geographically disjunct member of the genus, which is separated by other members by the Indian Ocean. It is found in Papua New Guinea and Indonesia.

Etymology
The specific name soa is from the Malagasy word beautiful or excellent.

Description
The females are about 3.72 mm long. Mesosoma and metasoma are black; antennae scrobe smooth and central keel present.

References

Insects described in 2018
Scelioninae